National Highway 166E, commonly referred to as NH 166E is a national highway in  India. It is a spur road of National Highway 66. NH-166E traverses the states of Maharashtra and Karnataka in India.

Route 
Guhagar, Chiplun, Patan, Palus, Karad, Kadegaon, Vita, Khanapur, Nagaj, Jat, Bijapur.

Junctions  
 
 NH 166C near Guhagar.
  near Chiplun.
  Interchange near Karad.
  near Karad.
  near Vita.
  near Nagaj.
  near Jat.
  Terminal near Bijapur.

Upgradation 
Post declaration of this route as national highway, construction process to upgrade the road to national highway standards started in 2017. Larsen & Toubro was awarded the contract to upgrade 48.4 km section from Helwak to Karad.

See also 

 List of National Highways in India
 List of National Highways in India by state

References

External links 

 NH 166E on OpenStreetMap

National highways in India
National Highways in Maharashtra
National Highways in Karnataka